Aghoseh (also Romanized as Āghoşeh and Agheşeh; also known as Aghoşbeh and A‘ẕeh) is a village in Arad Rural District, Arad District, Gerash County, Fars Province, Iran. At the 2006 census, its population was 271, in 54 families.

History 

Aghoseh village was founded in 1833(1212 AH) by Hossein Ali (I) Razmahang called Bagh Neshat.

References 

Populated places in Gerash County